Optima Bus, LLC, formerly Chance Coach Inc., was a brand of small transit buses manufactured by North American Bus Industries. It was established in 1976 in Wichita, Kansas.

It was originally the trolley-replica and conventional-bus production business of Chance Industries, Inc. In 1998, Chance Coach, Inc. was sold to American Capital Strategies, which rebranded the company as Optima Bus Corporation in 2003. American Capital subsequently sold Optima to North American Bus Industries, who closed the Kansas assembly plant on August 8, 2007, with production moved to their existing plant in Anniston, Alabama. Optima Bus is now North American Bus Industries, Inc.

Models

Current

 Opus: under  or under  low-floor bus, design based on Wrightbus bodywork
 American Heritage Streetcar AH-28 - trolley-style body on bus chassis
Opus ISE series hybrid
 Opus ISE Series Hybrid Buses is a hybrid Opus version. It utilizes ISE-Siemens ThunderVolt hybrid technology built around Siemens ELFA motors, generators and inverters.

Historic

Chance RT-52 is a small Shuttle Bus used in Hawaii. 17 Chance RT-52 Shuttle bus still in service.

Chance manufactured the Sunliner trams, an open-air towed tram used at various parks and zoos in the United States and Canada.

See also
 RT-52

References

External links

 Optima page on North American Bus Industries site
 Opus ISE Series Hybrid Bus

Bus manufacturers of the United States
Hybrid electric bus manufacturers
Companies based in Wichita, Kansas
Private equity portfolio companies
Cerberus Capital Management companies
Electric vehicle manufacturers of the United States